Anveshana is a 2002 Telugu language horror film written and directed by Sagar and produced by Prabhakar Reddy. The film stars Ravi Teja and Radhika Varma in the lead roles. This film markes the film debut of Radhika and the music director, Madhukar.

Plot 
Prabhakar mysteriously dies after walking on a train track. His brother, Vamsy, suspected that his death is not a suicide, but a planned murder. Vamsy falls in love with Bhavana and they subsequently marry as their horoscope matches. They later find letters addressed to Prabhakar telling him to come to the forest or face consequences. The rest of the story is how Vamsy and Bhavana figure out the truth behind Prabhakar's death.

Cast

Soundtrack 
The songs were composed by Madhukar. The song "Mama Mama Mama Eme Eme Bhama" from Manchi Manasulu (1962) was reused for this film.

Reception 

Idlebrain gave the film a rating of two out of five and wrote that "The first half of the film provides some entertainment and a few surprise elements. Second half is boring at times". The Hindu wrote that "There is nothing in the character of Vamsi for Raviteja to do anything. But for a new fights it is a drab role. Music composer Madhukar, making debut with this film, appears to be more a sound effects man".

References

External links 
 

2002 films
2000s Telugu-language films
Indian horror films
2002 horror films